The following is a timeline of the history of the city of Würzburg, Bavaria, Germany.

Prior to 19th century

 706 - Marienkirche, Würzburg (church) dedicated.
 741 - Roman Catholic Diocese of Würzburg established.
 788 - Cathedral consecrated.
 1042 -  church built.
 1057 -  founded.
 1165 - Imperial Diet held in Würzburg.
 1180 - Imperial Diet held in Würzburg.
 1189 - Rebuilt Würzburg Cathedral consecrated.
 1287 - Synod and Diet of Würzburg at which an imperial peace is declared
 1377 - Marienkapelle construction begins.
 1456 -  rebuilt.
 1479 - Printing press in operation.
 1525 - Battle of Wurzburg fought during the German Peasants' War.
 1576 - Julius Hospital founded.
 1582 - University of Würzburg active.
 1619 - Universitätsbibliothek Würzburg (library) founded.
 1643 - Würzburger Hofbräu (brewery) established.
 1691 -  (church) built.
 1703 -  (stone bridge) built.
 1744 - Würzburg Residence (palace) built.
 1789 -  church built.
 1796 - 3 September: Battle of Würzburg fought during the French Revolutionary Wars.

19th century
 1803
 Würzburg secularized.
 City becomes part of Bavaria.
 1805 - Grand Duke of Würzburg Ferdinand in power per Treaty of Pressburg.
 1815 - Würzburg becomes part of Bavaria again.
 1817 - Koenig & Bauer manufactory in business.
 1837 - University's Martin von Wagner Museum opens.
 1848 - Wurzburg Bishops' Conference (1848) held.
 1858 - Population: 36,052.
 1866 - Würzburg "bombarded and taken by the Prussians."
 1872 -  (library) founded.
 1887 -  built.

 1892 - Horse-drawn tram begins operating.
 1894 -  (bridge) built.
 1895 - Rontgen discovers X-radiation.
 1900 - Electric tram begins operating.

20th century
 1904 - Würzburger FV (football club) formed.
 1919
 SV Heidingsfeld (football club) formed.
 Population: 86,571.
 1921 - Mozart Festival Würzburg begins.
 1930 - Heidingsfeld and  become part of city.(de)
 1943 – Subcamp of the Flossenbürg concentration camp founded. Its prisoners were mostly Poles and Soviets.
 1945
 16 March: Bombing of Würzburg in World War II.
 22 March: Subcamp of the Flossenbürg concentration camp dissolved. Prisoners deported to the main Flossenbürg camp.
 31 March: Battle of Würzburg begins.
 6 April: Battle ends. Americans capture the city.
  newspaper begins publication.
 1952 -  in business.
 1954 - New Würzburg Hauptbahnhof (train station) opens.
 1971 - University of Applied Sciences Würzburg-Schweinfurt established.
 1974 -  becomes part of city.(de)
 1976 - Oberdürrbach and Unterdürrbach become part of city.(de)
 1978 -   and  become part of city.(de)
 1991 - Hanover–Würzburg high-speed railway begins operating.

21st century
 2010 - Population: 133,799.(de)
 2012 - .
 2014 -  becomes mayor.
 2016 - 18 July: Train attack near Würzburg.
 2021 - 25 June: Stabbing.

See also
 
 List of mayors of Würzburg (in German)
 
 History of Franconia region
 Timelines of other cities in the state of Bavaria: Augsburg, Munich, Nuremberg

References

This article incorporates information from the German Wikipedia.

Bibliography

in English

in German

External links

  (city archives)
 Items related to Würzburg, various dates (via Europeana)
 Items related to Würzburg, various dates (via Digital Public Library of America)

Würzburg
Würzburg
Würzburg
Würzburg